The United States National Recording Preservation Board selects recorded sounds for preservation in the Library of Congress' National Recording Registry. The National Recording Registry was initiated to maintain and preserve "sound recordings that are culturally, historically or aesthetically significant"; to be eligible, recordings must be at least ten years old. Members of the Board also advise the Librarian of Congress on ongoing development and implementation of the national recorded sound preservation program.

The National Recording Preservation Board (NRPB) is a federal agency located within the Library of Congress. The NRPB was established by the National Recording Preservation Act of 2000 (Public Law 106–474). This legislation also created both the National Recording Registry and the non-profit National Recording Preservation Foundation, which is loosely affiliated with the National Recording Preservation Board, but the private-sector Foundation (NRPF) and federal Board (NRPB) are separate, legally distinct entities.

The main responsibilities of the board are:
 Develop the National Recording Registry selection criteria
 Recommend and review nominees
 Develop a National Recording Preservation Study and Action Plan comparable to those by the National Film Preservation Board

Organization
The board is appointed by the Librarian of Congress and is composed of representatives from professional organizations of composers, musicians, musicologists, librarians, archivists and the recording industry.  Explicitly it is composed of up to 5 "at-large" members and 17 member/alternate pairs from the following 17 organizations:
American Society of Composers, Authors and Publishers
American Federation of Musicians
American Folklore Society
American Musicological Society
Association for Recorded Sound Collections
Audio Engineering Society
Broadcast Music Incorporated
Country Music Foundation
Digital Media Association
Music Library Association
National Archives and Records Administration
National Academy of Popular Music
National Association of Recording Merchandisers
National Academy of Recording Arts and Sciences
Recording Industry Association of America
SESAC
Society for Ethnomusicology

See also

National Film Preservation Board

Notes

External links
Home Page

Sound archives in the United States
Music archives in the United States
2000 establishments in the United States